Matthew Casey is a fictional character on the NBC drama Chicago Fire, portrayed by actor Jesse Spencer. Casey is a firefighter at Firehouse 51. He was a lieutenant from Seasons 1 through 6 and from season 6 is a captain in the Chicago Fire Department on Truck Company 81. 

The character had an ongoing feud with Detective Hank Voight (Jason Beghe), a protagonist in Chicago Fire spin-off Chicago P.D. Casey's storyline crosses with Voight's once again in the season 3 finale of Chicago Fire, after he reluctantly agrees to help Voight with an undercover investigation.

Background and characterization
As the leader of the truck company, Casey's cool, standoffish demeanor and no-nonsense attitude sometimes put his crew off, but he is respected by them and highly regarded by Chief Boden. He is extremely private about his personal life, preferring to wallow in his own problems rather than seek help from his colleagues.  He sometimes comes across as distant and aloof, as he usually keeps to himself during down time, even when around colleagues in the lounge room. In the season 4 premiere, Herrmann tellingly comments that the way Casey deals with things is "not dealing with it"; of all the characters, he generally confides in Severide or Dawson and only after he is at his breaking point. Despite this, Casey does care for his men and will not hesitate to defend them, even if it means standing up to his superiors and risking his own career. He trusts the men of his truck company implicitly (and vice versa) and is generally quite lax with them in good faith that they will maintain professional standards themselves, only disciplining them when he has no choice. However, he is known for being tough with candidates, as seen with Mills, Jones, and Borrelli, and would either personally or have one of his more senior firefighters regularly drill them.

Casey is the son and youngest child of Gregory and Nancy Casey and has an older sister, Christie. He is burdened by his ex-convict mother Nancy, who shattered the family 15 years earlier when she murdered his abusive father. He and his older sister grew distant with each other after their father's death, but they have since mended their relationship. His family still remains a touchy subject and, according to veterans Mouch and Herrmann, there is an unspoken rule within the firehouse that no one is to mention Casey's family or ask him about them. His relationship with Gabriela Dawson was a major storyline throughout the series and they eventually married in the series' 100th episode. Their relationship ended when Dawson left Chicago to head a rescue-and-relief unit in Puerto Rico at the end of season 6, and they eventually divorced.

After Dawson's departure, Casey gradually grew closer to her former partner, paramedic-in-charge Sylvie Brett, throughout seasons 7 to 9. Eventually they fell in love with each other and finally consummated their relationship in the season 9 finale "No Survivors". In the season 10 episode "Two Hundred" Casey moves to Oregon to take care of Andrew Darden's sons, becoming their legal guardian, but maintains a long-distance relationship with Brett.

A skilled handyman and carpenter, Casey freelances as a construction contractor when off-duty. Other characters have consulted him for advice on construction-related issues. For example, he was "consulted" by Herrmann on renovation works and building code compliance for Molly's and built a ramp for a paraplegic accident victim he and his men had rescued.

Character arc

Chicago Fire

In the pilot, Casey and Kelly Severide are shown to be good friends since their days at the fire academy and longtime coworkers who are at loggerheads with each other, much to Chief Boden's frustration, over the death of fellow firefighter and close friend Andy Darden due to a bad call. Although they try to remain professional in front of their men, their spats often make their way into the firehouse off duty to the point where they indirectly insult each other, with newest candidate Peter Mills getting caught in the crossfire. They eventually put aside their animosity by the end of the first season. Throughout the show they are often seen putting themselves in danger to assist each other during dangerous calls. Both are known to their men as intensely guarded and reticent about their personal lives but they confide in each other, usually over a beer or sharing a cigar on the firehouse roof.

Darden's death affects Casey in the following episodes because he is forced to look after Darden's two young sons when Darden's widow, Heather, is imprisoned for DUI manslaughter. He discovers that he was named their legal guardian in the Dardens' will, and their time together helps him develop a strong relationship with the boys. The fact that Heather still keeps in contact with Casey is a sore point for him and Severide as she blames Severide for failing to prevent her husband's death.

Casey is engaged to Dr. Hallie Thomas for a time, but she tells him she never wants to have children (in contrast to his desire for them) and they decide to break it off. He tentatively pursues Gabby Dawson but they end up staying friends. At the end of the first season in "Ambition", Hallie returns and Casey rekindles his relationship with her. After discovering a drug ring in a clinic where she works, she is murdered in the season 1 episode "Leaders Lead". Despite Casey and Severide’s efforts to rescue her from the fire set at her clinic, Casey is told by a doctor that Hallie has died, and he begins weeping in Mills’ arms. At the end of season 1 and the prelude into season 2, Gabby shows up at his door helping him cope with Hallie's death. She has for a long time had a crush on him, but on a casual date at her cousin's Christmas party, he "kissed her on the cheek" when she tried to kiss him, and from then on Dawson seems mad at him. In the season 2 episode "Rhymes with Shout" he shows up at Gabby's door and kisses her. At the start of the next episode, they are shown waking up in bed together. In the season 2 episode "Not Like This", Casey risks his life to save a baby in a burning building and is rushed to the hospital in critical condition. When he gets back on the job, he suffers from neurological symptoms such as memory loss, uncharacteristic outbursts of anger and headaches but keeps this from his colleagues, although his erratic behavior is quickly picked up by several veteran coworkers and Dawson. When he begins to bleed from his ear, he sees a doctor who tells him that it was caused by a crack in his skull and warns him that another hit to the head could be catastrophic. He decides not to tell his colleagues or the Chief, fearing that he would be forced into disability retirement.

After Mills breaks up with Dawson for various reasons (one being Dawson’s feelings for Casey), Dawson and Casey begin to spend more time together, partially because Casey has to look after Heather's children (even with his 24-hour shifts) and asks for help. After spending more time together, Casey and Dawson decide for the moment they are happy just being friends. Casey eventually gets help from Dawson's friend, Isabella, to get Heather moved to a minimum security facility so that she can see Griffin and Ben more often. In the episode "No Regrets", Heather gets released due to overcrowding and she moves to Florida because she can't live in Chicago without being reminded of both her husband and friend's death. This deeply saddens Casey, but he understands. In the episode "You Will Hurt Him", Casey and Dawson wake up in bed together. Dawson still has doubts and fears about Casey's commitment but he tells her, "I had a chance at this a year ago and I blew it. I've been regretting it ever since." He further assures his commitment by telling her "As far as I'm concerned, it's our time now." They kiss and start a relationship. He proposes to her in the season two finale "Real Never Waits", but before he can get an answer the bells go off and they head to a call at which Shay is killed. This puts off his plans for a while but months later in "Wow Me", Casey proposes to Dawson again at the Fire academy, and she happily says "yes" even before he can finish the question. The two then go home to have sex. However, their happiness is short lived because Dawson joins Truck 81 and therefore as coworkers they cannot get married. In "Nobody Touches Anything", the two share how they would do anything if they could get married now and seal it with a kiss. This is also short-lived because after they are caught kissing, things go downhill for the couple. Following Shay's death, Severide moves in with Casey and Dawson. Some of the strain on Casey and Dawson's relationship comes from Casey and Severide's relationship; with Casey putting Severide in front of Dawson. This, amongst other things, leads Dawson to break up with Casey in "Let Him Die". In "Headlong Toward Disaster", Severide turns down an order from his chief to spy on Casey. He also tells the chief that Casey is "one of the finest firefighters [he's] ever had the opportunity to work with in the entire CFD." Severide is the only person on the show, besides Dawson and Chief Boden, to call Casey by his first name. Casey is the only person on the show to call Severide by the nickname Sev, while Severide is the only person on the show to call Casey by the nickname Case.

In the season 3 episode "Category 5", Casey knowingly turns down Voight's help (hinting that there are still tensions between him and Voight) with a case of human trafficking that involves the owner of a strip club, Jack Nesbitt. Nesbitt is a former firefighter and friend. Casey initially takes on construction as a favor but senses that something is not right about some of Nesbitt's "business associates". He eventually agrees to help Voight get intel about Nesbitt. In the season finale, "Spartacus", he is discovered missing when Dawson goes to his house to check on him. She finds his apartment trashed and torn apart and the dead body of a stripper named Katya who had worked for Nesbitt's strip club. Casey is nowhere to be found, presumably kidnapped.

It is revealed that Katya had been compiling a notebook of evidence with the intention of exposing the trafficking ring running out of Nesbitt's nightclub. She went to Casey's house to ask for help but they are ambushed by Bulgarian criminals who kill Katya on the spot. For the first several episodes, Casey is seen struggling to come to terms with Nesbitt's betrayal and having to witness a murder in his own home. His inner turmoil is somewhat assuaged when Dawson, who is temporarily on desk duty at the Office of Fire Investigation, reveals to him that she is pregnant with their child. They intended to keep the secret "in-house" but word eventually spreads to their colleagues, even to their contemporaries at the CPD, but Dawson suffers a miscarriage.

Casey's relationship with Dawson became strained when they disagree over her decision to foster Louie, a boy they had rescued who had no listed next of kin. He comes to accept Louie, much to Dawson's delight. They push for an adoption but a judge tells him that their chances are slim due to the lack of evidence that they are in a committed relationship. In the 100th episode he and Dawson get married and file for the adoption together. However, Louie's biological father files for custody, having just returned from a deployment in Afghanistan and having learned about Louie's existence recently. He succeeds as he is backed by his immediate family members.

In the season 5 finale "My Miracle", Casey's life is left hanging in the balance when he is trapped in a warehouse fire along with Herrmann, Mouch, Kidd, Otis, Severide and Kannell. His fate is not revealed until the season 6 premiere, and he calls Gabby "my miracle" in what looks like a goodbye speech to her as he is not sure if he will be able to get out.

In the season 6 premiere "It Wasn't Enough", Boden makes the call to open up the water cannon, ordering the men to take cover any way they can. Casey is seen taking cover using a metal cabinet, as well as shielding a victim. When Boden finds Casey, he is passed out under the cabinet with his PASS alarm going off. The episode jumps two months later where the firehouse looks to be at a memorial to his life. They are in dress blues for this, but it turns out Casey receives a medal of valor after the fire and he along with the rest of Firehouse 51 return to normal lives.

In "An Even Bigger Surprise", he is recommended for promotion to Captain after rescuing a suicidal mentally unstable person from jumping off a building. In "A Breaking Point", after rescuing Dawson from the collapsed parking garage, he is promoted to Captain. Uniformed personnel clap for him and Dawson and the two hug. In "Devil's Bargain" he snaps at Ramon and then gets in to it with Dawson. He also has come to blows with Severide after they decide how to get a patient down who is trapped in wire on a building.

In "Down Is Better", after having learned that Hope, Sylvie Brett's friend from Indiana, has forged a signature from a fire chief, Matt and Chief Boden dismiss her from the fire station. In "Slamigan", Casey and Dawson are awarded temporary foster guardian of Bria Jamison, a runaway teen who has an addict father and family members who want nothing to do with her. In "Law of the Jungle", in the middle of a call of a warehouse fire, Casey and Severide jump off the roof as it explodes. In "The F Is For", he and Severide jump into the river fully clothed, and while Casey swims and heads to the surface, Severide is injured, and Kidd rescues him. Casey is then comforted by Gabby, and Severide recovers.

In "The Strongest Among Us", Casey helps Gabby get Bria ready for prom. He decides they should have something good to remember so he lets Bria and her date ride in the Truck. After the truck leaves Gabby tells Matt she wants to start trying again which he agrees to. In "The Grand Gesture", after going to a doctor and finding out Gabby has a 10% chance of dying if she gets pregnant, he decides he doesn't want her getting pregnant. He brings up adoption and looks into it, which makes Gabby upset since she's afraid the same thing will happen that happened to Louie. After a fight in the last episode, Gabby tells Matt she'll be right back and goes to ask about a job in Puerto Rico while he stays home, not sure where his wife has gone. In "A Closer Eye", his wife Gabriela, comes back from Puerto Rico only for her to leave once and for all. In "Going to War", while fighting an apartment fire, Brett expresses blame to Casey for letting Gabby go, only for him to tell her that there was nothing anyone else could do.

In "The Solution to Everything", Casey tells Severide that he and Dawson are divorced. He starts dating a reporter named Naomi but she tells him in "Inside These Walls" that she is going to Zurich. He is surprised but happy that she helped him deal with the departure of his ex-wife.

In "You Choose", Brett helps Casey look for an apartment to live in following the fire that destroyed his old apartment. She finds what appears to be the "perfect apartment", but Casey decides to move in with Severide following his breakup with Stella Kidd. In "Fault in Him", while on a call for a suicide attempt and getting a clear from one of the officers, he is ambushed by a gunman who had killed his brother. In "Move a Wall", as he deals with his post-traumatic stress stemming from the events, he takes it out on Herrmann when Ritter gets injured on a call. 

In "Double Red", While on the scene of a call, Casey is hit by an uncooperative drunk driver and he fears that his career at the fire department may be over. In "Natural Born Firefighter", Casey goes to get an MRI as a result of his head injury and Brett comes with him. He says that the results could mean he might have to quit the CFD.
The MRI shows no damage to his brain. The complaints were caused because of a shoulder injury. Both Brett and Casey are happy to hear Casey is cleared to return to full duty. They share a long and passionate hug. 

In "Don't Hang Up", Brett and Casey grow distant from each following Casey's test results.

In "A White-Knuckle Panic" Casey finally confessed his true feelings to Brett and tells her that he loves her, and they consummated their relationship in the season 9 finale "No Survivors". 

In the season 10 episode "Two Hundred", Casey moves to Oregon to take care of Andrew Darden's sons as well as he applied to Portland Fire Department.

In the season 10 episode "The Magnificent City of Chicago", Casey came back to Chicago for Kelly and Stella's wedding.

Relationships
Hallie Thomas

In season 1, he is engaged to Dr. Hallie Thomas but they end it when she tells him she doesn't want to have kids. Later on, they resume the relationship. However, at the end of season 1, Hallie dies in a fire at the clinic where she works.

Gabriela (Gabby) Dawson

His relationship with Dawson starts at the end of season 1 after the death of his fiancée Hallie. Their relationship goes up and down. At the end of season 3, Dawson reveals she is pregnant. However, she loses her child as a result of ectopic pregnancy in the beginning of season 4. They foster Louie at the end of season 4 and in season 5, they marry in the 100th episode in order to successfully adopt Louie.

At the end of season 6, Dawson leaves for Puerto Rico to work in relief help. She returns once more in the opening episode but tells Casey she will move there. She returns to Chicago for a charity event in "Best Friend Magic".

Sylvie Brett

After the departure of Dawson, Matt grew close to her partner, Sylvie. They have been there for each other during tough times, like when Casey lost his home to arson or her break-up with a CFD chaplain. However, after a friend mentioned that Sylvie should be with Matt, she was initially confused by her feelings for him, especially since she was close to his ex-wife. However, she got engaged to her ex-boyfriend before Matt could ask her out.

In season 8, Sylvie is still confused by her feelings for Matt, getting overly defensive when he assumes she was going on a date. However, Matt helps her through a very difficult time of not only reconnecting with her birth mother, but in the aftermath of her death and the possibility of raising her new baby half-sister on her own.

In season 9, Matt's feelings for Brett become more apparent when he offered to stay at Sylvie's place after she suspects a violent brother of an OD patient may be out for revenge and after her ambulance was run off the road, Matt jumped out of the truck without it stopping. This culminates to a kiss at the end of the episode, but Brett stops before it progresses any further because of their relationship with Dawson. While the two try to move on from the kiss, Matt struggles to get over her and she begins dating another truck lieutenant at another firehouse. However, when an old head injury threatens Casey's career, Brett was there for him, but causing her boyfriend to break up with her. After Severide encouraged him, Casey told Brett about his real feelings for her and a period of awkwardness between them, she admitted the same. Soon, after they consummated their relationship.

In season 10, Casey moves to Oregon to take care of Andrew Darden's sons, becoming their legal guardian, but he and Sylvie still love each other, and they agree to continue dating each other, with their relationship turning into a long-distance relationship.

In the premiere of Season 11, Sylvie broke up with Casey as they have grown apart due to the distance between them.

Crossover appearances
Casey has appeared on Chicago P.D., mainly in cross-overs. Although he is on friendly terms with most characters, he has a notable grudge against Sgt. Hank Voight due to the fact that he was a victim of Voight's cover as a corrupt cop running with local gangs and was made livid by Voight's cover-up of his son's DUI. The animosity has since faded some since Voight saved him from being shot by Jack Nesbitt in the nick of time and assisted Boden in several arson-related investigations. Matt even showed sympathy to Voight after the loss of his son, Justin.

 Chicago P.D.: "8:30 PM" (April 30, 2014) 
 Chicago P.D.: "The Number of Rats (April 29, 2015)
 Chicago P.D.: "The Silos" (September 21, 2016)
 Chicago P.D.: "Don't Bury This Case" (January 3, 2017)
 Chicago Med: "Cold Front" (February 16, 2017)
 Chicago P.D.: "Profiles" (March 7, 2018)
 Chicago Med: "When To Let Go" (October 3, 2018)
 Chicago P.D.: "Good Men" (February 20, 2019)
 Chicago Med: "The Space Between Us" (March 27, 2019)
 Chicago Med: "We're Lost in the Dark" (October 2, 2019)

References

Chicago Fire (TV series) characters
Fictional characters from Chicago
Fictional firefighters
Fictional construction workers
Fictional politicians
Television characters introduced in 2012
Crossover characters in television
American male characters in television